Alessandro Sangiorgi (born 12 November 1999) is an Italian professional footballer who plays as a midfielder.

Club career
Formed in Pro Vercelli youth system, Sangiorgi made his first debut team for Serie C on 6 October 2018 against Carrarese. He missed the next season because a injury.

On 20 February 2021, he joined Serie D club Chieri, on loan for the rest of the season.

On 31 January 2022, he signed a contract until 30 June 2024 with Fermana.

References

External links
 
 

1999 births
Living people
People from Melzo
Footballers from Lombardy
Italian footballers
Association football midfielders
Serie C players
Serie D players
F.C. Pro Vercelli 1892 players
Fermana F.C. players
Sportspeople from the Metropolitan City of Milan